Manaia Nuku is a New Zealand rugby sevens player.

Nuku attended Hamilton Girls' High School and made her debut for Waikato in the Farah Palmer Cup in 2020. She was given a full-time rugby sevens contract with the Black Ferns Sevens in 2021.

Nuku played for the Black Ferns Pango team at the 2022 Oceania Sevens at Pukekohe. She was named as a non-travelling reserve for the Black Ferns Sevens squad for the 2022 Commonwealth Games in Birmingham.

References

External links 
Black Ferns Profile

2003 births
Living people
New Zealand female rugby union players
New Zealand female rugby sevens players
New Zealand women's international rugby sevens players